Josep María Comadevall Crous (born 24 November 1983), known as Pitu, is a Spanish footballer who plays as a central midfielder.

Club career
Born in Salt, Girona, Catalonia, Pitu emerged through local – and national – giants FC Barcelona's youth ranks, making his senior debut in the 2005–06 season with the reserves in the Segunda División B. On 20 May 2006 he played his first and only La Liga match, coming on as a substitute for Ludovic Giuly in the second half of a 3–1 loss against Athletic Bilbao at the San Mamés Stadium, as the Frank Rijkaard-led side had already been crowned league champions.

Subsequently, after one season with Barcelona neighbours Girona FC in the Tercera División, Pitu signed with Segunda División club UD Las Palmas, appearing sparingly for the Canary Islands team over the course of one and a half seasons. He spent the following five years in the third tier, returning to the second in 2014 after scoring eight goals in 40 games – play-offs included – for UE Llagostera.

References

External links

1983 births
Living people
People from Gironès
Sportspeople from the Province of Girona
Spanish footballers
Footballers from Catalonia
Association football midfielders
La Liga players
Segunda División players
Segunda División B players
Tercera División players
FC Barcelona C players
FC Barcelona Atlètic players
FC Barcelona players
Girona FC players
UD Las Palmas players
CF Gavà players
CF Badalona players
CE L'Hospitalet players
UE Costa Brava players
Indian Super League players
FC Pune City players
Spanish expatriate footballers
Expatriate footballers in India
Spanish expatriate sportspeople in India